The Peavey Delta Blues 115 is a guitar amplifier produced by Peavey Electronics. It is a tube amplifier designed for Blues musicians. The name is inspired by the Delta blues, an early style of blues music that originated in the Mississippi Delta. The 15 inch speaker is part of its distinctive mid-range and low end sound. It is complemented by the Delta Blues 210 in the Peavey lineup. The Peavey Delta Blues 115 is comparable to the Fender '65 Twin Custom 15, along with other amplifiers. The Delta Blues 115 is a member of the Classic Series family of amplifiers, and is very similar to its sister amp the Peavey Classic 30, aside from some different features.

Characteristics
30 watts RMS into 16 or 8 ohms
All-tube (three 12AX7 and four EL84 tubes)
2-channel preamp
15 inch Blue Marvel speaker
Optical tremolo
Two channels
3-band passive EQ
Boost switch
Master reverb
Effects loop
External speaker jack

References

Instrument amplifiers
Peavey amplifiers